Tamila Hryhorivna Holub (born 15 March 1999) is a Ukrainian-born Portuguese swimmer. She competed in the women's 800 metre freestyle event at the 2016 Summer Olympics.  She began attending and swimming for NC State University in Fall 2017. She has qualified to represent Portugal at the 2020 Summer Olympics.

In 2019, she represented Portugal at the 2019 World Aquatics Championships held in Gwangju, South Korea. She competed in the women's 800 metre freestyle and women's 1500 metre freestyle events. In both events she did not advance to compete in the final. She also competed in the women's 4 × 200 metre freestyle relay event.

References

External links
 

1999 births
Living people
Sportspeople from Cherkasy
Olympic swimmers of Portugal
Swimmers at the 2016 Summer Olympics
Swimmers at the 2018 Mediterranean Games
Swimmers at the 2014 Summer Youth Olympics
Ukrainian emigrants to Portugal
Portuguese female freestyle swimmers
Mediterranean Games competitors for Portugal
Swimmers at the 2020 Summer Olympics
20th-century Portuguese women
21st-century Portuguese women
Swimmers at the 2022 Mediterranean Games
Portuguese people of Ukrainian descent